Political entities in the 13th century BC – Political entities in the 11th century BC – Political entities by century

This is a list of political entities in the 12th century BC (1200–1101 BC).

Sovereign states

See also
List of Bronze Age states
List of Classical Age states
List of Iron Age states
List of states during Antiquity

References
 

-12
12th century BC-related lists